Dynasty Warriors is a weapon-based fighting video game developed by Omega Force and published by Koei. It was released in 1997 for the PlayStation for all territories. Unlike the later installments in the series which are hack and slash, Dynasty Warriors is a "one-on-one" fighting game.

Contemporary gaming journalists noted Dynasty Warriors for being a startling departure from the strategy games that Koei was known for. Upon release, it was greeted as a success in this regard by most critics.

Gameplay
All combat is weapon-based, similar to the Samurai Shodown, The Last Blade, and Soulcalibur series. Rather than having a single all-purpose block button, as in most fighting games, the player must parry the enemy's strikes by executing their own attack at the same height with the correct timing, leaving the enemy vulnerable to attack. The stages are in morning, noon, and dusk.

Name and series
In Japan, the game was released as Sangokumusou. With the next installment in the series a departure in genre and style from the original Dynasty Warriors, it was entitled Shin Sangokumusou in Japan. Nevertheless, in Europe and North America, the game was released as Dynasty Warriors 2, leading to a discrepancy in title numbers that has continued ever since.

Characters
The game features 16 characters, six of whom are hidden by default. These characters are mainly historical figures from the Three Kingdoms era of China, though two characters, Nobunaga and Toukichi, are figures from the Warring States period of Japan; two of them only appear in the first game and Koei's Samurai Warriors. The characters are not grouped into factions, as each have individual slots similar to most fighting games; for convenience, characters are listed according to the factions they are accorded to in later games.

Bold denotes default characters.

Development
Dynasty Warriors was first unveiled at the November 1996 PlayStation Expo, shocking attendees familiar with Koei's track record of historical simulation video games. The character's animations were all created using motion capture.

Reception

Dynasty Warriors was met with positive reception upon release. GameRankings gave it a score of 78% based on 7 reviews. It was called "a fluid, masterful fighter... a breath of fresh air in a world of repetitive, eye-candied wannabes" by Game Informer and "an intriguing mix of Tekken-like polygonal fighters, a difficult but ultimately rewarding defense system, and a deep and complex backstory based on actual, historic figures" by Next Generation. Most critics said it was roughly on par with its nearest competitor, Soul Blade, though GamePro held that Soul Blade was clearly superior, elaborating that "the glaring lack of kick attacks cuts the fun in half."

Critics widely remarked that the translation of the historical setting into a fighting game was surprisingly successful, offering players an experience that is painstakingly authentic and even educational. Most also found the defensive system difficult to master but highly rewarding. Crispin Boyer remarked in Electronic Gaming Monthly that "Dynasty Warriors lets those who like and those who dislike block buttons beat each other up in peace and harmony."

The visual were also well-regarded, particularly the detail in the characters and the smoothness of the animation. However, many criticized the static, two-dimensional backgrounds, though Next Generation appended that they were most likely a necessary trade-off for the smoothness of the frame rate.

References

Notes

External links
 

1997 video games
3D fighting games
Dynasty Warriors
Fighting games
Koei games
Multiplayer and single-player video games
PlayStation (console) games
PlayStation (console)-only games
Video games developed in Japan
Video games set in China
Video games based on Chinese mythology